Vibrasphere was a progressive trance music trio from Uppsala, Sweden and  Brussels,Belgium Its founding members were Rickard Berglöf, Robert Elster and Pierre Baekelmans.

History 
Rickard was previously a member of early Goa group Subcouds and at around the same time Robert had started musical production on an Amiga. After meeting through Rickard's younger cousin, and a friend in Brussels, the pair decided to start studio recordings in June 1998 with the creation of Vibrasphere.

Robert decided to quit the group half a year after the release of their second album, Lime Structure, due to constant touring. He was temporarily replaced by Pierre Baekelmans and together with Rickard they continued both touring and studio recording. In 2005 Robert decided to rejoin the group, leaving Rickard still in charge of touring duties, Pierre Baekelmans decided to leave the band in 2009 to record and tour alone as Pitsnake.

Their fourth album, Exploring the Tributaries (2007), took a few more leaps towards progressive, fading the barriers between trance and house music while also featuring dub, downbeat and ambient tracks.

In November 2010, Vibrasphere announced it was disbanding. The group's website stated "We are very sorry to inform you that we have decided to close down the Vibrasphere project. This is due to several reasons, but mainly we feel it is time to move on to other projects within the music. After all, 12 years is a very long time for any music project. We are very grateful to all the fans, promoters, labels, djs and other people that have supported us in the past 12 years."

Discography 
Echo (Spiral Trax) 2000
Lime Structure (Digital Structures) 2003
Archipelago (Digital Structures) 2006
Exploring the Tributaries (Tribal Vision) 2007
Lungs of Life (Tribal Vision) 2008

Vinyl
The Open Sphere (Psychic Deli Records) 1999
Nowhere (Transient Records) 1999
Mental Mountain (Spiral Trax) 2000
Airfield (Acid Casualties) 2001
Niño Loco (Dragonfly Records) 2002
Stereo Gun (Spiral Trax) 2003
Lime Remixes (Digital Structures) 2003
Archipelago (Digital Structures) 2006
Early Years (Tribal Vision Records) 2016

Compilations
Selected downbeats Vol. 1 (Cloud 99 Music) 2006
Selected downbeats Vol. 2 (Cloud 99 Music) 2009

References

External links
 http://www.vibrasphere.com
 Discography on discogs.com

Swedish psychedelic trance musicians
Musical groups from Uppsala